Georges de Morsier (25 February 1894, Paris – 9 January 1982, Geneva) was a French-Swiss neurologist.

He studied natural sciences and medicine in Geneva, and following graduation, returned to Paris as an assistant to psychiatrist Gaétan de Clérambault. In 1928 he became a privat-docent for neurology and psychiatry. In 1941 he became an associate professor at Geneva, where in 1960, he was appointed professor of neurology and director of the university neurological clinic. From 1962 onward, he was also in charge of the neurological polyclinic.

Known for his research of visual hallucinations, he is credited with coining the terms "Charles Bonnet syndrome" (named after Swiss biologist Charles Bonnet) and "Zingerle syndrome" (named after Austrian neurologist Hermann Zingerle) for specific hallucinatory conditions. He also honored his mentor, Gaétan de Clérambault, with a syndrome — it being defined as a hallucinatory state characterized by auditory and visual hallucinations associated with chronic psychosis. The condition was earlier described by Clérambault in the context with his research on mental automatisms.

The eponym "De Morsier's syndrome" is a synonym for septo-optic dysplasia.

Bibliography 
 Les trémulations fibrillaires et la contracture rigide du cœur. Medical thesis, Geneva 1922.
 Pathologie du diencéphale. Les syndromes psychologiques et syndromes sensorio-moteurs. Schweizer Archiv für Neurologie und Psychiatrie, Zurich, 1944, 54: 161-226. 
 Études sur les dysraphies, crânioencéphaliques. III. Agénésie du septum palludicum avec malformation du tractus optique. La dysplasie septo-optique. Schweizer Archiv für Neurologie und Psychiatrie, Zurich, 1956, 77: 267-292.
 Contribution à l’étude clinique des altérations de la formation réticulée: Le syndrome sensorio-moteur et psychologique. Journal of the Neurological Sciences, Amsterdam, 1966, 4: 15-49
 L'enseignement de neurologie. In : La faculté de Médecine de Genève 1876-1976. Genève 1978. p. 86-89..

References

External links 
 Reappraisal of the optic nerve hypoplasia syndrome J Neuroophthalmol. 2012 Mar;32(1):58-67. doi: 10.1097/WNO.0b013e31824442b8.

1894 births
1982 deaths
Academic staff of the University of Geneva
Swiss neurologists
Scientists from Paris